Utricularia kenneallyi is an annual terrestrial carnivorous plant that belongs to the genus Utricularia (family Lentibulariaceae). It is endemic to the Kimberley region of Western Australia.

See also 
 List of Utricularia species

References 

Carnivorous plants of Australia
Eudicots of Western Australia
kenneallyi
Lamiales of Australia